The 2009 FIBA EuroChallenge Final Four was the concluding tournament of the 2008–09 FIBA EuroChallenge. BolognaFiere Virtus won its first title.

Bracket

Final standings

FIBA EuroChallenge Final Fours
Final four
2008–09 in Italian basketball
2008–09 in French basketball
2008–09 in Russian basketball
basketball
International basketball competitions hosted by Italy